Tufts Magazine is a biannual magazine published by the Trustees of Tufts University. It has been published since 2000.

A central publications office produces Tufts Magazine, Tufts Nutrition, Tufts Dental Medicine, Tufts Medicine and Tufts Veterinary Medicine, and on occasion the same story may appear in more than one of these magazines. Tufts Magazine is circulated only to alumni. The four magazines for the professional schools are each circulated to non-alumni who are connected to these schools. 

As of 2004 the free magazine, which does not accept advertising, had a circulation of 80,000.
In 2011 the magazine won the Bronze Medal in the "Circulations of 75,000 and Greater" category from CASE (Council for Advancement and Support of Education), in competition with 45 other publications.

References
Citations

Sources

2000 establishments in Massachusetts
Advertising-free magazines
Alumni magazines
Biannual magazines published in the United States
Free magazines
Magazines established in 2000
Magazines published in Massachusetts
Tufts University